The Schober group is a sub-range of the Hohe Tauern mountains in the Central Eastern Alps, on the border between the Austrian states of Tyrol (East Tyrol) and Carinthia. Most of the range is located inside Hohe Tauern national park.

Geography
The range comprises central parts of the Hohe Tauern south of the neighbouring Glockner Group and the Alpine divide. In the south it stretches down to the East Tyrolean capital Lienz and the Drava Valley. In the east, the Grossglockner High Alpine Road leads up to Hochtor Pass via Großkirchheim.

Neighbouring ranges 

The Schober group is bordered by the following other ranges in the Alps:

 Glockner Group (to the north)
 Goldberg Group (to the east)
 Kreuzeck group (to the SE)
 Gailtal Alps (to the S)
 Villgraten Mountains (to the SW)
 Granatspitze Group (to the NW)

Peaks 

All the named three-thousanders in the Schober group:

Alpine huts 

 Adolf-Noßberger Hut
 Elberfelder Hut
 Gernot-Röhr Bothy
 Gößnitzkopf Bothy
 Hochschober Hut
 Lienzer Hut
 Wangenitzsee Hut
 Winklerner Hut

Accident 
On 8 September 2016 shortly after takeoff on the return leg of a supply flight to the Elberfelder Hut, a helicopter crashed, and the pilot, Hannes Arch, was killed. The hut manager, who had spontaneously decided to accompany Arch, was injured but was able to be rescued.

References

Maps 
 Alpine Club map 41 Schobergruppe. Deutscher Alpenverein: Munich, 2005, .

Literature 
 Gerhard Karl, Michael Krobath: "Die Schobergruppe, ein stilles Kleinod der Hohen Tauern" in: Berg 2006 (Alpine Club Yearbook, Vol. 130) with Alpine Club map 41 of the Schober group, pp. 270–283.
 Walter Mair: Alpenvereinsführer Schobergruppe. Bergverlag Rudolf Rother: Munich, 1979, .

External links 

Mountain ranges of Tyrol (state)
Mountain ranges of the Alps
Mountain ranges of Carinthia (state)
 
Geography of East Tyrol